Marianne von Eschenburg (1856-1937) was an Austrian painter. She was known for her portrait paintings.

Biography
von Eschenburg was born on 18 April 1856 in Vienna, Austria. She was a student of her uncle, Karl von Blaas. She studied in Paris with Carolus-Duran, Henri-Jean Guillaume Martin, and Elisa Koch.

She exhibited at the Salzburger Kunstverein and the Vienna Künstlerhaus.

von Eschenburg  exhibited her work at The Woman's Building at the 1893 World's Columbian Exposition in Chicago, Illinois. 

She died on 28 October 1937 in Vienna, Austria.

Gallery

References

External links
 

 
1856 births
1937 deaths
Austrian women painters
19th-century Austrian women artists
20th-century Austrian women artists
19th-century Austrian painters
20th-century Austrian painters
Artists from Vienna